The discography of Anjulie, a Canadian pop music singer-songwriter, consists of one studio album, eleven singles (including one as a featured artist) and eight music videos. Anjulie began her career as a songwriter, penning tracks for several artists in the mid-2000s with Jon Levine. Together, they co-wrote songs for artists including The Philosopher Kings and Kreesha Turner.

Her self-titled debut studio album was released in August 2009. It reached number 108 on the United States Billboard 200 chart. Three singles, "Boom", "Love Songs" and "Rain", were released from the album: "Boom" peaked at number one on the US Hot Dance Club Songs chart. In early 2011, Anjulie released the single "Brand New Bitch". The song reached number 16 in Canada and was certified platinum by Music Canada (MC). Persaud co-wrote the 2012 single "The Boys", which peaked at #41 on the Billboard Hot R&B/Hip-Hop Songs chart, and the song "Behind the Music" featured on the US release of Cher Lloyd's debut album Sticks and Stones, in 2012.

Studio albums

Singles

As lead artist

As featured artist

Music videos

Other appearances

References

External links
 
 

Discographies of Canadian artists
Pop music discographies